Shevchenkivskyi District is an urban district of the city of Lviv, named after Ukrainian poet and artist Taras Shevchenko. This district covers northern part of the city. It contains such neighborhoods as Pidzamche, Holosko, Klepariv, Zamarstyniv, Zboyishcha, India, Keiserwald, Kamyanka and Ryasne. In the northwest it borders with the town of Bryukhovychi and Bryukhovychi forest.

See also
Subdivisions of Ukraine

References

Urban districts of Lviv